A geodesic polyhedron is a convex polyhedron made from triangles. They usually have icosahedral symmetry, such that they have 6 triangles at a vertex, except 12 vertices which have 5 triangles. They are the dual of corresponding Goldberg polyhedra with mostly hexagonal faces.

Geodesic polyhedra are a good approximation to a sphere for many purposes, and appear in many different contexts. The most well-known may be the geodesic domes designed by Buckminster Fuller, which geodesic polyhedra are named after. Geodesic grids used in geodesy also have the geometry of geodesic polyhedra. The capsids of some viruses have the shape of geodesic polyhedra, and fullerene molecules have the shape of Goldberg polyhedra. Geodesic polyhedra are available as geometric primitives in the Blender 3D modeling software package, which calls them icospheres: they are an alternative to the UV sphere, having a more regular distribution of vertices than the UV sphere. The Goldberg–Coxeter construction is an expansion of the concepts underlying geodesic polyhedra.

Geodesic notation
In Magnus Wenninger's Spherical models, polyhedra are given geodesic notation in the form {3,q+}b,c, where {3,q} is the Schläfli symbol for the regular polyhedron with triangular faces, and q-valence vertices. The + symbol indicates the valence of the vertices being increased. b,c represent a subdivision description, with 1,0 representing the base form. There are 3 symmetry classes of forms: {3,3+}1,0 for a tetrahedron, {3,4+}1,0 for an octahedron, and {3,5+}1,0 for an icosahedron.

The dual notation for Goldberg polyhedra is {q+,3}b,c, with valence-3 vertices, with q-gonal and hexagonal faces. There are 3 symmetry classes of forms: {3+,3}1,0 for a tetrahedron, {4+,3}1,0 for a cube, and {5+,3}1,0 for a dodecahedron.

Values for b,c are divided into three classes:
 Class I (b=0 or c=0): {3,q+}b,0 or {3,q+}0,b represent a simple division with original edges being divided into b sub-edges.
 Class II (b=c): {3,q+}b,b are easier to see from the dual polyhedron {q,3} with q-gonal faces first divided into triangles with a central point, and then all edges are divided into b sub-edges. 
 Class III: {3,q+}b,c have nonzero unequal values for b,c, and exist in chiral pairs. For b > c we can define it as a right-handed form, and c > b is a left-handed form.

Subdivisions in class III here do not line up simply with the original edges. The subgrids can be extracted by looking at a triangular tiling, positioning a large triangle on top of grid vertices and walking paths from one vertex b steps in one direction, and a turn, either clockwise or counterclockwise, and then another c steps to the next primary vertex.

For example, the icosahedron is {3,5+}1,0, and pentakis dodecahedron, {3,5+}1,1 is seen as a regular dodecahedron with pentagonal faces divided into 5 triangles.

The primary face of the subdivision is called a principal polyhedral triangle (PPT) or the breakdown structure. Calculating a single PPT allows the entire figure to be created.

The frequency of a geodesic polyhedron is defined by the sum of ν = b + c. A harmonic is a subfrequency and can be any whole divisor of ν. Class II always have a harmonic of 2, since ν = 2b.

The triangulation number is T = b2 + bc + c2. This number times the number of original faces expresses how many triangles the new polyhedron will have.

Elements
The number of elements are specified by the triangulation number . Two different geodesic polyhedra may have the same number of elements, for instance, {3,5+}5,3 and {3,5+}7,0 both have T=49.

Construction
Geodesic polyhedra are constructed by subdividing faces of simpler polyhedra, and then projecting the new vertices onto the surface of a sphere. A geodesic polyhedron has straight edges and flat faces that approximate a sphere, but it can also be made as a spherical polyhedron (a tessellation on a sphere) with true geodesic curved edges on the surface of a sphere and spherical triangle faces.

In this case, {3,5+}3,0, with frequency  and triangulation number , each of the four versions of the polygon has 92 vertices (80 where six edges join, and 12 where five join), 270 edges and 180 faces.

Relation to Goldberg polyhedra
Geodesic polyhedra are the dual of Goldberg polyhedra. Goldberg polyhedra are also related in that applying a kis operator (dividing faces triangles with a center point) creates new geodesic polyhedra, and truncating vertices of a geodesic polyhedron creates a new Goldberg polyhedron. For example, Goldberg G(2,1) kised, becomes {3,5+}4,1, and truncating that becomes G(6,3). And similarly {3,5+}2,1 truncated becomes G(4,1), and that kised becomes {3,5+}6,3.

Examples

Class I

Class II

Class III

Spherical models
Magnus Wenninger's book Spherical Models explores these subdivisions in building polyhedron models. After explaining the construction of these models, he explained his usage of triangular grids to mark out patterns, with triangles colored or excluded in the models.

See also
Conway polyhedron notation

References

 Robert Williams The Geometrical Foundation of Natural Structure: A source book of Design, 1979, pp. 142–144, Figure 4-49,50,51 Custers of 12 spheres, 42 spheres, 92 spheres
 Antony Pugh, Polyhedra: a visual approach, 1976, Chapter 6. The Geodesic Polyhedra of R. Buckminster Fuller and Related Polyhedra  Reprinted by Dover 1999 
 Edward S. Popko, Divided spheres: Geodesics & the Orderly Subdivision of the Sphere'' (2012) Chapter 8 Subdivision schemas, 8.1 Geodesic Notation, 8.2 Triangulation number 8.3 Frequency and Harmonics 8.4 Grid Symmetry 8.5 Class I: Alternates and fords 8.5.1 Defining the Principal triangle 8.5.2 Edge Reference Points

Geodesic polyhedra